Albert A. Tate Jr. (September 23, 1920 – March 27, 1986), was a long-serving Louisiana judge. A Democrat, Tate served as a justice of the Louisiana Supreme Court in New Orleans, and as a judge of the United States Fifth Circuit Court of Appeals, also based in New Orleans.

Biography
Tate received a B.A. from George Washington University in 1941, and was a U.S. Army special agent during World War II, from 1942 to 1945, thereafter receiving an LL.B. from Yale Law School in 1947. He was in private practice in Ville Platte, Louisiana, from 1948 to 1954.

He was a judge of the Louisiana Court of Appeal for the First Judicial Circuit from 1954 to 1960, and presiding judge of the Louisiana Court of Appeal for the Third Judicial Circuit from 1960 to 1970, and was also a professor of law at Louisiana State University from 1967 to 1968. Upon his election to the Third Circuit Court of Appeal, Tate "was the youngest state court of appeal judge ever elected in Louisiana"; he eventually became the senior presiding judge of all the courts of appeal in the state. He served as an associate justice of the Louisiana Supreme Court from 1970 to 1979.

Federal judicial service

Tate was nominated by President Jimmy Carter on July 31, 1979, to the United States Court of Appeals for the Fifth Circuit, to a new seat created by 92 Stat. 1629. He was confirmed by the United States Senate on October 4, 1979, and received his commission on October 5, 1979. His service was terminated on March 27, 1986, due to his death in New Orleans, Louisiana. He was succeeded by Judge John M. Duhé Jr.

References

Sources
 
 "Albert Tate", A Dictionary of Louisiana Biography, Vol. 2 (1988), pp. 780–781
 

1920 births
1986 deaths
People from Opelousas, Louisiana
People from Ville Platte, Louisiana
Lawyers from New Orleans
Louisiana Democrats
New York Military Academy alumni
George Washington University alumni
Yale Law School alumni
Military personnel from Louisiana
United States Army personnel of World War II
Louisiana state court judges
Justices of the Louisiana Supreme Court
Judges of the United States Court of Appeals for the Fifth Circuit
United States court of appeals judges appointed by Jimmy Carter
20th-century American judges
20th-century American lawyers
Place of death missing
20th-century American writers
Louisiana State University faculty
20th-century American non-fiction writers